It Pays to Advertise or simply Advertise! (Swedish: Annonsera!) is a 1936 Swedish comedy film directed by Anders Henrikson and starring Thor Modéen, Håkan Westergren and Birgit Tengroth. It was shot at the Råsunda Studios in Stockholm. The film's sets were designed by the art director Arne Åkermark. It is inspired by the 1914 Broadway play It Pays to Advertise by Roi Cooper Megrue and Walter C. Hackett, previously adapted into the 1931 film of same title starring Carole Lombard.

Synopsis
The son of a soap tycoon is so reckless with money and living a life of luxury that his father cuts him off financially. With a small amount of money, encouraged by his father's secretary, establishes his own competing soap-manufacturing business which relies heavily on a strong advertising campaign.

Cast
 Thor Modéen as 	Soap Director Miller
 Håkan Westergren as	Henry Miller
 Åke Söderblom as Ambrosius Bergman
 Birgit Tengroth as 	Mary Lind, Secretary
 Valdemar Dalquist as 	Oskar Fagerberg 
 Anders Henrikson as Adolf Fagerberg
 Eric Abrahamsson as 	Karlsson
 Sonja Claesson as 	Berta 
 Hartwig Fock as Olsson 
 Sven-Eric Gamble as 	Office Boy 
 Eric Gustafson as 	Director Jönsson 
 Jullan Jonsson as 	Hilma, Cook 
 Ingrid Luterkort as	Fagerberg's Telephone Operator 
 Ka Nerell as 	Office Girl
 Hjördis Petterson as 	Miss Berg 
 Arnold Sjöstrand as 	Maître d' 
 Ruth Stevens as 	Eva Zander 
 Margit Tirkkonen as 	Telephone Operator 
 Oscar Åberg as 	Accountant

References

Bibliography 
 Wallengren, Ann-Kristin.  Welcome Home Mr Swanson: Swedish Emigrants and Swedishness on Film. Nordic Academic Press, 2014.

External links 
 

1936 films
Swedish comedy films
1936 comedy films
1930s Swedish-language films
Films directed by Anders Henrikson
Swedish black-and-white films
Swedish films based on plays
Remakes of American films
Films set in Stockholm
1930s Swedish films